Yaprak Dökümü (The Fall of Leaves) is a novel by Turkish author and playwright Reşat Nuri Güntekin, written in 1930. It is available in an English translation by W. D. Halsey

Plot summary
The novel revolves around a middle-class Turkish family (the Tekins) in the 1930s. The main characters are Ali Riza Tekin (head of the Tekin family), his wife Hayriye, and their young daughters: Fikret (the oldest daughter), Leyla (the second daughter), Necla (the third daughter), Ayşe (their youngest daughter), their only son Şevket (who is between Fikret and Leyla), and his bride Ferhunde (who is also the principal antagonist).

See also
Turkish literature
Reşat Nuri Güntekin

External links

In English
Reşat Nuri Güntekin- Information about Reşat Nuri Güntekin on an official website on Turkish culture

In Turkish
About the novel

1930 novels
Novels by Reşat Nuri Güntekin
Fiction set in the 1930s
Novels set in Turkey
1930s novels